Jacobo Fitz-James Stuart y Falcó, 17th Duke of Alba, 10th Duke of Berwick, GE (17 October 1878 – 24 September 1953) was a Spanish peer, diplomat, politician, art collector and Olympic medalist. A Jacobite, he was the most senior surviving male-line descendant of James II, and despite having never made a claim, he was considered by some as the legitimate heir to the throne of Scotland. He was one of the most important aristocrats of his time and held, among other titles, the dukedoms of Alba de Tormes and Berwick, the Countship of Lemos, Lerín, Montijo and the Marquessate of Carpio. He was granted the Order of the Golden Fleece of Spain in 1926.

A close friend and relative of the British royal family, he was one of the leading guests at the Wedding of Queen Elizabeth II in 1947.

Family
The Duke was born on 17 October 1878 in Palace of Liria in Madrid, the first son of Carlos María Fitz-James Stuart, 16th Duke of Alba and María del Rosario Falcó, 21st Countess of Siruela. Don Jacobo was baptised only a few days after with the name "Santiago", a variant of Jacobo. His godparents were his paternal grandfather, Jacobo Fitz-James Stuart, 15th Duke of Alba and his maternal grandmother María del Pilar Ossorio y Gutiérrez de los Ríos, 3rd Duchess of Fernán Núñez.

On 7 October 1920 he married Maria del Rosario de Silva, 9th Marchioness of San Vicente del Barco (Madrid, 4 April 1900 – Madrid, 11 January 1934), lady of the bedchamber to Queen Victoria Eugenie and sole heiress to the enormous fortune and long list of titles of the house of Híjar as the only child of Alfonso de Silva, 16th Duke of Híjar and her mother María del Rosario Gurtubay, at the Spanish Embassy in London. The two had a single daughter, Cayetana, who inherited all of the family's titles and fortune.

Early years

He carried out his first studies under private tutors, but was later sent to England to study at Beaumont College, followed by Eton. After returning to Spain, he continued with his higher education enrolling in the Universidad Central de Madrid, where he obtained his bachelor's degree in Law.

Diplomatic career

He served as Lord of the Bedchamber to the young King Alfonso XIII, who had acceded on his birth. In May 1902, royal visitors came to Madrid for the festivities to mark the King's birthday and enthronement. The Duke received the Knight Grand Cross of the Royal Victorian Order (GCVO) from the Duke of Connaught, who was present for the festivities.

Between 2 February 1930 and 18 February 1931, Alba was Foreign Minister of Spain. During the Spanish Civil War, the Communists occupied his residence, the Palace of Liria, which his daughter later restored, and they murdered his younger brother Hernando Carlos María Teresa Fitz-James Stuart y Falcó (1882-1936).

Alba became General Franco's official representative in London and opened the new building at Campion Hall, University of Oxford, in June 1936, alongside Alban Goodier S.J., the former Archbishop of Bombay, and the Earl of Oxford. He was still the ambassador there in 1939, when Neville Chamberlain's cabinet formally gave to Franco's Nationalists diplomatic recognition.

The master Soviet spy Kim Philby wrote in his memoir My Silent War that the Spanish diplomatic bag during the Second World War was regularly accessed, "and from it [we] learnt that Alba periodically sent to Madrid despatches on the British political scene of quite exceptional quality. As we had no doubt that the Spanish Foreign Ministry would make them available to the German allies, these despatches represented a really serious leakage. Yet there was nothing that could be done. There was no evidence that the Duke had obtained his information improperly. He simply moved with people in the know and reported what they said, with shrewd commentaries of his own." In fact, King George VI was warned of this possibility in October 1943, as his Private Secretary Sir Alan Lascelles reported in his diary, and advised not to say anything that he did not want to reach the enemy.

After the war, Alba's relations with Franco markedly cooled, the result of Alba supporting a prompt monarchist restoration much more than Franco. Alba was a leading guest at the 1947 wedding of Princess Elizabeth and Philip, Duke of Edinburgh.

Olympic career
He won a silver medal in polo at the 1920 Summer Olympics.

Honours 
 1902: Knight Grand Cross Royal Victorian Order.
 1925: Grand Cordon Order of Leopold.
 1926: Knight Order of the Golden Fleece.

Titles and styles

Titles

Dukedoms
 17th Duke of Alba, Grandee of Spain
 13th Duke of Huéscar, Grandee of Spain -Ceded to his grandson Don Carlos
 10th Duke of Berwick, Grandee of Spain
 10th Duke of Liria and Jérica, Grandee of Spain
 10th Duke of Montoro, Grandee of Spain -Ceded to his daughter Doña Cayetana
 2nd Duke of Arjona, Grandee of Spain

Count-Dukedoms
 11th Count-Duke of Olivares, Grandee of Spain

Marquessates
 17th Marquess of Carpio, Grandee of Spain
 22nd Marquess of Coria
 19th Marquess of Ardales -Ceded to his sister Doña Sol
 19th Marquess of la Mota
 19th Marquess of Moya
 18th Marquess of Sarria
 17th Marquess of Barcarrota
 17th Marquess of Villanueva del Fresno
 16th Marquess of Villanueva del Río
 15th Marquess of la Albaga
 13th Marquess of Eliche
 13th Marquess of San Leonardo
 11th Marquess of Osera
 11th Marquess of Tarazona

Countships
 21st Count of Lemos, Grandee of Spain
 21st Count of Siruela, Grandee of Spain
 19th Count of Lerín, Grandee of Spain, Constable of Navarre
 11th Count of Montijo, Grandee of Spain
 19th Count of Osorno, Grandee of Spain
 15th Count of Monterrey, Grandee of Spain
 13th Count of Baños, Grandee of Spain
 24th Count of San Esteban de Gormaz
 20th Count of Miranda del Castañar
 20th Count of Modica (Kingdom of Sicily)
 19th Count of Villalba
 18th Count of Andrade
 17th Count of Gelves
 16th Count of Galve
 15th Count of Casarrubios del Monte
 15th Count of Fuentes de Valdepero
 13th Count of Ayala
 11th Count of Santa Cruz de la Sierra
 10th Count of Fuentidueña
 10th Earl of Tinmouth

Viscountcies
 11th Viscount of la Calzada

Baronies
 10th Baron Bosworth

Styles
 The Most Excellent The Duke of Huéscar (1878–1901)
 The Most Excellent The Duke of Alba de Tormes (1901–1953)

Coat of arms

References

External links
 

|-

|-

|-

|-

1878 births
1953 deaths
20th-century art collectors
Jacobo Fitz-James
Dukes of Montoro
Dukes of Huéscar
Marquesses of Spain
Counts of Spain
Viscounts of Spain
Foreign ministers of Spain
Knights of the Golden Fleece of Spain
Honorary Knights Grand Cross of the Royal Victorian Order
Spanish people of English descent
Grandees of Spain
Spanish anti-communists
Marquesses of Carpio
International Olympic Committee members
Berwick, Jacobo Fitz-James Stuart, 10th Duke of
People educated at Eton College
People educated at Beaumont College
Corresponding Fellows of the British Academy
Spanish polo players
Polo players at the 1920 Summer Olympics
Olympic medalists in polo
Olympic polo players of Spain
Olympic silver medalists for Spain
Medalists at the 1920 Summer Olympics
Spanish nobility